South Korea, also known as Republic of Korea is a nation located in East Asia. It is a peninsula with 3 parts of its nation facing the sea; east, west and south. There are numerous wildlife existing in Korean Peninsula. The characteristics of the wild mammals in Korea is that despite South Korea's small territory, there are many medium and large sized animals. It is natural characteristic that medium and large sized animals require large land and vast amount of food to survive. The characteristic of fauna in South Korea follows the regional aspect that the nation is connected to the wider Eurasian continent, resulting, surviving mammals to also have continental elements.

History 

Aristotle primarily divided 'sensitive' biological organisms into animals and 'non-sensitive' biological organisms as plants. Unlike livestock, which have become tamed for at least a few century and have a much different appearance and character to their inhabitants in the wild, wild animals have intrinsic characteristics. People are accustomed to be more familiar to livestock and often know their original form as livestock. But, the difference between the livestock and wild fauna is that livestock evolved in a direction favorable to human, whilst other fauna still consist their wild instinct. To have a clear insight of South Korea's wild fauna, In the case of wolves, unlike dogs that evolved to actively pursue cooperation with humans, they do not show any reliance on humans. The wild version of the pig, the Wild Boar, is larger on average than the pigs used for food, and also has long hair with sharp tusks.

During the Japanese colonial era, vast number of wild fauna were poached leading some of the species to be threaten to potential extinction. Initially, the wild Tiger, which inhabited on the Korean Peninsula was a Siberian tiger species. It was very large in its size and large number existed throughout the nation. However, as part of the Korean annihilation policy of the Joseon Dynasty, Japanese hunters were invited to hunt tigers. It is well known that tigers are originally the culmination of the food chain, yet, during this period of the time nearly 800 were hunted as the Japanese colonial rule, leading the species itself to face potential extinction. Currently, there are only few left close on the border to China.

Again, the Leopard on the Korean Peninsula, which had clear stripes and larger size compared to other general leopards were widely hunted during the Japanese colonial era. Nearly 2000 were hunted, and only few are left in China. Recently, it has been informed that only about a total of 10 leopards are preserved at the zoo.

The wolves that inhabited in the Korean Peninsula were species with their own unique characteristic. It had dark brown hair compared to other wild wolves. Again, about 3,000 of them were hunted by hunters during the same period of time. Unlike other species, the wild wolves existed in Korean Peninsula eventually went extinct in the wild. Restoration effects are currently being undertaken by geneticists

A fox on the Korean Peninsula belonging to the Red Fox were also widely hunted during the Japanese colonial era. It was hunted at random for the purpose of making luxury goods using their hair. Among Japanese ladies at the time, it was said that products made from Korean fox were fashionable. The wild fox were known to have been extinct for decades, but recently some were found in the wild. A very small number has yet to be found alive in the wild. It is urgently designated as a protected species and is dedicated to the study and conservation of species. However, even now, the few remaining numbers are decreasing due to illegal poaching.

Dokdo was once home to a large group of sea lions. However, as Japanese fishermen started to poach, more than 100,000 number of sea lions were poached. The group of sea lions inhabited here are believed to have been extinct or moved to other places to avoid fishermen.

Ecology 
Korea is located between 33 ° and 43 ° N, the eastern end of the Eurasian continent. It is rich in precipitation and has various seasonal climate characteristics. In Korea, there are large proportion of areas occupied by mountains, and mainly mountains are distributed in the north and east part of the nation. Large and gentle rivers flow along west and south, and there are various erosion and sediment terrains along the rivers. On the southern coast, there are many islands and complex coastlines, and a wide tideline appears on the west coast. Dunes and lagoons are developed along the monotonous coastline on the east coast.

The habitat of wild forest has been damaged or cut off every year due to the development of roads and industrial complexes, and the total area of forests of 67,000 m2 is reduced annually by farmland, new city, industrial complex development.

In addition, Korea is expected to suffer sustain warming and increased precipitation due to climate change. Also, frequent and intense extreme climate is expected. It is estimated that after 2071, South Korea will enter the sub-tropical climate, with the exception of some high altitudes in Baekdudaegan. Furthermore, In the forecast of the spatial distribution of precipitation, it is expected that the areas with more than 1,600mm of annual precipitation will increase gradually in Jeju and some parts of the southern coast, and after 2040, in Gangwon, South region of the country and Jeju.  This threats changes in the species throughout the biodiversity and result ecosystem disturbance. 18 species of vertebrates, 28 species of invertebrates, 44 species of plants, and 10 species of fungi and algae are mainly expected to be threaten.

Law 
There are a total of 10 laws related to protected areas in Korea. Among the 10 laws, the three laws including the Natural Environment Conservation Act, the Marine Environment Management Act, and the Cultural Properties Protection Act provide general provisions for protection of natural environments and cultural properties. It specifies contents about designation of area. The other seven laws contain the management of the designated area as the main contents, and the provisions for the designation and management of the protected area for the object of preservation are stipulated.

Diversity

Species 
The number of living species in Korea is estimated to be about 100,000 species. So far, 42,756 species have been recorded. Out of whole, 25,453 species have been recorded in the animal family, which comprises 59.5% of the total recorded species. When divided more specifically, 1,936 species are vertebrates, 102 species are resting animals and 23,415 species are invertebrates.

Korea is a peninsula located in Northeast Asia. Ecologically, Baekdu Mountain Alpine Zone and two large rivers isolate the Korean Peninsula from the continent. The Yalu River in the northwest of the Korean Peninsula and the Tumen River in the northeast play a role in limiting the movement of wildlife from China and Russia. Therefore, the isolation by Tuman and Yalu rivers from the Korean Peninsula shows that the percentage of endemic species of freshwater fish and insects to be high. An endemic species refers to a species of organism that lives only in geographically limited areas or countries, and represents species that live only in that area all over the world. Of the 100,000 species currently identified, approximately 10% are believed to be endemic species in Korea. Four species of mammals, four species of algae, five species of amphibians, one species of reptiles and 59 species are known as endemic species in Korea.

Amongst, 246 species of endangered wildlife (Class I and II), there are 166 animal species. Out of 35,569 species of internationally endangered species (I, II and III), there are 5,659 animal species.31 species of wildlife are prohibited from eating, 479 species of wildlife are prohibited from capturing, 568 species of wild animals are prohibited to be exported and licensed. In the case of marine life, 77 kinds of endangered species living in the marine or coastal area and domestic endemics.

In order to preserve endangered species, the Korean Government has designated certain species as natural monuments.

Habitat 
Various climatic changes and complex terrain have also contributed to the emergence of diverse ecosystems, which have led to greater biodiversity. Deciduous broad-leaved forests are present in the northern part whereas subalpine coniferous forests are present in the central part. Temperate evergreen forests are present in the south part as well as in the island areas. Characteristics of such forests have resulted different fauna to survive in different regions. On the northern part of the country, where, deciduous broad-leaved forests are present, shrewmouse, rabbits, wolves, fox, tigers and lynx are mostly present. On the central part of the country where subalpine coniferous forests are present, mole, raccoon and wildcat widely exist. On the southern part of the  country, bats, sea lion, dolphins and seal widely exist.

One of the unique aspect of South Korea's fauna environment is that they have a demilitarized zone. Demilitarized zone has been designated as a 2 km zone (4 km in total) between North and South, centered on the MDL (Military Demarcation Line) since the Korean War. The southern boundary of the Demilitarized Zone is the SLL (Southern Limit Line) and the northern boundary is the NLL (Northern Limit Line). For over 60 years, The area has been strictly forbidden for public activities, preserving natural ecosystems, and attracting attention as Asia's largest protected area.

One of the characteristics of the DMZ is that the wetland ecosystem is well formed. In the region there are a wide variety of wetlands ranging from valley wetlands in the eastern region to lowland wetlands in the western region. This is where many people lived and built rice fields in the past. These places have been left as wetland ecosystems for 60 years after the Korean War. The wetland ecosystem of the DMZ shows how past farmlands and lowlands developed into wetlands. The Han River estuary where the Cheorwon Plain area, Panmunjom area, Imjin river and the Han river meet with the west coast plays an important role as the final destination for the migratory birds. In Cheorwon Plain, more than 3,000 eagles come to spend winter each year.

DMZ has the most biodiversity in Korea in terms of distribution of mammals and algae, which is the peak of the natural ecosystem. The largest number of natural monuments and species of endangered species such as bears, foxes, musk deer and other species are present in this region. The DMZ is well developed with rivers and wetlands, and holds a variety of fish species and abundant populations.

In addition, plant distribution of DMZ is also unique. It is home to a variety of species including endangered wild animals and plants, such as parasitic flowers, winged larks, and plum blossoms. These naturalized plants are mainly dandelion, swine grass, maple leaf swine and evening primrose. In particular, maple leaves and pig grasses originating in North America are threatened by indigenous plant ecosystems. These alien species were estimated to have been handed over to Korea by the US army at the time of the Korean War. Thus, the DMZ has a unique natural ecosystem that can not be seen elsewhere, and is a place of study that shows the process of changing natural ecosystems after the war.

Currently, the DMZ may be better known abroad than in Korea. Increasing number of people come and visit the region. The International Union for Conservation of Nature (IUCN) and the United Nations Environment Program (UNEP) have been organizing the DMZ International Environmental Park on both sides of the Korean Peninsula. South Korea is also striving to designate the preservation area of UNESCO Border Biosphere Reserve, to certify UNESCO World Geological Park, and to designate UNESCO World Heritage.

See also 
Wildlife of South Korea

References

Bibliography 

https://www.cbd.int/doc/world/kr/kr-nr-05-en.pdf 
https://www.cbd.int/doc/world/kr/kr-nbsap-v3-en.pdf